Bahr Salamat is a seasonally intermittent river in Chad. It flows southwards, and is a tributary of the Chari River. 

When the Bahr Salama river is flowing, it runs through the community of Am Timan and also the Bahr Salamat Faunal Reserve of Chad. The Chari River is a tributary of Lake Chad

See also
Chari River topics

References

Rivers of Chad
Ramsar sites in Chad
Chari River